USS Paducah is a name used more than once by the U.S. Navy:

 , a gunboat commissioned 2 September 1905.
 , a yard tug placed in service 24 February 1961.

United States Navy ship names